Dappledown Farm was a British children's television programme, starring and presented by Brian Cant and a series of puppets. It started airing in 1990 on TVAM before moving to Channel 5's Milkshake! when the series got rebooted in 1998.
Despite production of the show stopped in 1999, it was still shown in repeats until 2005.

In the show's narrative, Cant's character Brian was the owner of the Dappledown Farm.  For each episode, he introduced feature cartoons from a studio farm set. For example, in the first episode, Brian told the story of animals on the farm that hatched from an egg such as birds, snakes, and tortoises. In addition to the puppets, the show also integrated stories that involve real-life animals.

Puppet characters
Puppet characters in the show included: Dapple the Horse; Mabel the Cow; Stubble and Straw, the two mice; Columbus the Cockerel; Lucky Ducky; Colin the Coot; Millie the Moorhen; Fiona the Frog; and Harry the Heron. These characters had different personalities that range from mischievous to bashful. For this reason, there are times when they quarrel with each other and Brian the farmer served as the mediator.

The puppets were created by the Hands Up Puppets company.

VHS
• Dappledown Farm 1: Water 

▪ Dappledown Farm 2: Forgetful Brian

References

External links

British television shows featuring puppetry
Fictional farms
1990s British children's television series
1990 British television series debuts
1999 British television series endings
ITV children's television shows
Channel 5 (British TV channel) original programming
English-language television shows